is an athletic stadium in  Hōfu,  Yamaguchi, Japan.

External links

Football venues in Japan
Sports venues in Yamaguchi Prefecture
Hōfu, Yamaguchi
Athletics (track and field) venues in Japan
Multi-purpose stadiums in Japan